During the history of Buchenwald concentration camp, thousands of people were imprisoned.

List of prisoners

Frans Frison, Member of the Belgian Resistance from Mechelin/Malines, transported from Breendonk. Died 2002 Kilkinny, Ireland. http://www.getuigen.be/Getuigenis/Peeraer-Jef/tkst.htm
 Roy Allen, American pilot
 Jean Améry, Austrian-Belgian writer
 Robert Antelme, French writer
 Jacob Avigdor, before World War II Chief Rabbi of Drohobych, afterward Chief Rabbi of Mexico
 Conrad Baars, psychiatrist
 Fritz Beckhardt, German-Jewish World War I fighter pilot
 Fritz Behr, German politician (SPD, SED), educator and literary scholar who would become mayor of Weimar
 Robert Benoist, French world champion motor racing driver and member of the British Special Operations Executive, executed on 9 September 1944
 Bruno Bettelheim, Jewish Austrian-American child psychologist
 Józef Biniszkiewicz, Polish socialist politician
 Léon Blum, Jewish French politician, pre-and post-war long-term French prime minister
 Dietrich Bonhoeffer, Protestant theologian and prominent member of the Confessing Church
 Boris Braun, Croatian University professor
 Rudolf Brazda, the last known surviving homosexual deported to the camps; died in 2011
 Rudolf Breitscheid, former member of the SPD and leader of its faction in the Weimar Reichstag, died in the camp in 1944
 Christopher Burney, British officer and Special Operations Executive (SOE) operative
 Marian Ciepielowski, Polish physician
 Robert Clary, French actor, Corporal Louis LeBeau in the Hogan's Heroes television series
 René Cogny, French general
 Seweryn Franciszek Światopełk-Czetwertyński, Polish politician
 Édouard Daladier, French politician, former head of the French government
 Marcel Dassault, French aviation entrepreneur who founded the Dassault Group
 Hélie de Saint Marc, member of the French resistance, later involved in the attempted Algiers putsch of 1961
 Léon Delarbre, French artist and museum curator
 Laure Diebold, French resistant, Compagnon de la Libération
 Willem Drees, Dutch politician and prime minister, held as hostage in Buchenwald from 1940 to 1941
 Ernest Emanuel Israel Dreyfus, painter who emigrated to London and then to Chicago, Illinois
 Franz Ehrlich, German architect, designer of the Buchenwald entrance gates
 Marian Filar, Polish Jewish concert pianist and virtuoso. 
 Ludwik Fleck, Polish serologist and philosopher of science.
 Henri Frager, French resistance member, second in command of CARTE, then head of DONKEYMAN network
 Josef Frank (politician), Czech communist
 Carl Simon Fried, physician, radiologist, poet
 Joseph Friedenson, writer and editor
 August Froehlich, German Roman Catholic priest active in resistance movement against the National Socialism
 Henry P. Glass, Austrian Architect and Industrial Designer, transferred from Dachau in September 1938, released in January 1939, moved to the US
 Albin Grau, film producer (Nosferatu, 1922)
 Maurice Halbwachs French sociologist, died in the camp in 1945
 , Dutch psychiatrist
 Bertrand Herz, French engineer, president of IKBD (International Committee Buchenwald Dora and commandos)
 Curt Herzstark inventor of the Curta calculator, hand-held, hand-cranked mechanical calculator
 Heinrich Eduard Jacob, German writer
 Paul-Émile Janson, Belgian politician, former Prime Minister of Belgium, died in the camp in 1944
 Léon Jouhaux, French trade unionist and Nobel Peace Prize laureate
 Józef Kachel, Scout leader, head of the pre-war Polish Scouting Association in Germany
 Imre Kertész writer, 2002 Nobel Prize in Literature recipient
 Eugen Kogon, anti-Nazi activist, later Christian Socialist, professor, broadcaster and author 
 Phillip (Phil) J. Lamason, Squadron Leader, Royal New Zealand Air Force
 Leon Lasota, (born 1921) Polish resistance fighter and political dissident. Successfully escaped the camp after three years of internment.  Subsequently assisted the Allies as a translator.    
 Yisrael Meir Lau (born 1937), Ashkenazi Chief Rabbi of Israel
 Hermann Leopoldi, Austrian composer and entertainer
 Fritz Löhner-Beda, Austrian lyricist
 Artur London, senior Czech communist and writer, future government minister

 Jacques Lusseyran, blind French memoirist and professor
 Henri Maspero, French Sinologist, pioneering scholar of Taoism, died in the camp in March 1945
 Karl Mayr, Adolf Hitler's immediate superior in an Army Intelligence Division in the Reichswehr, 1919–1920, died in the camp in 1945
 Mel Mermelstein
 Paul Morgan, Austrian actor, died in the camp in 1938 
 John H. Noble, American-born gulag survivor and author; Family owner of the Praktica Camera factory, Dresden 1945
 Andrée Peel, Member of the French resistance
 Rudolf Perth, Austrian politician and Jew 1938.
 Harry Peulevé, an agent of the SOE who managed to escape Buchenwald with F. F. E. Yeo-Thomas.
 Henri Christiaan Pieck, Dutch painter and twin brother of Anton Pieck
 Karl Plättner, Communist
 Paul Rassinier, considered the father of Holocaust denial
 Jean Riboud, French corporate executive and former chairman of Schlumberger
 Jakob Rosenfeld, minister of health under Mao
 Herbert Sandberg, artist, designer, publisher of Ulenspiegel
 Paul Schneider, German pastor, died in the camp in 1939
 Jorge Semprún, Spanish intellectual and politician and culture minister of Spain (1988–91)
 Jura Soyfer, Austrian poet and dramatist, died in the camp in 1939
 Boris Taslitzky (1911- 2005), French painter.
 Ernst Thälmann, leader of the Communist Party of Germany, died in the camp in April 1944
 Jack van der Geest, escapee
 Fred Wander, Austrian writer
 Ernst Wiechert, German writer
 Elie Wiesel, Romanian Jewish French-American writer, 1986 Nobel Peace Prize recipient
 F. F. E. Yeo-Thomas, Royal Air Force Wing Commander and British Special Operations Executive (SOE) agent, codenamed "The White Rabbit"
 Petr Zenkl, Czech National Social Party politician, deputy Prime Minister of Czechoslovakia (1946–1948)
 Princess Mafalda of Savoy, the daughter of Victor Emmanuel III of Italy, died in the camp in 1944.
 Joachim Ernst, Duke of Anhalt, died in Soviet custody in 1947.
 Ferdinand Münz (1888-1969), chemist. The inventor of EDTA.

Buchenwald concentration camp